Lauro De Marinis (born July 11, 1990), known professionally as Achille Lauro, is an Italian singer, songwriter and rapper. He gained popularity in the Italian hip hop scene and he competed in the Sanremo Music Festival 2019 with the song "Rolls Royce", at the 2020 edition with the song "Me ne frego", and at the 2022 edition with the song "Domenica". He represented San Marino at the Eurovision Song Contest 2022 with the song "Stripper", after winning Una voce per San Marino, but failed to qualify from the semi-final.

Early life 
Lauro De Marinis was born on July 11, 1990 in Verona, Italy. His father, Nicola De Marinis, is a professor and a magistrate on the Supreme Court of Cassation. His mother, Cristina Zambon, is now the administrator of Achille Lauro's holding company De Marinis Group. He grew up in Rome and at age 14 lived with his older brother, Federico, after his parents moved to another city.

Career

2012–2014: Career beginnings, Barabba, Harvard, and Achille Idol Immortale 
Achille Lauro's brother, Federico, was a producer for Quarto Blocco and introduced Lauro to the world of underground rap music. De Marinis decided to use the stage name Achille Lauro after people associated his name Lauro with Achille Lauro, the owner of a cruise ship with the same name that was hijacked in 1985 and sank in 1994, throughout his childhood.

On 14 April 2012, Lauro released his first mixtape titled Barabba. This mixtape was available as a free download.

After signing with Roccia Music, Lauro's debut studio album Achille Idol Immortale was released on 27 February 2014 and featured artists such as Marracash, Gemitaiz, and Coez.

2015–2018: Dio c'è, Ragazzi madre, and Pour l'amour 
On 25 May 2015, Lauro's second studio album Dio c'è was released. The album peaked at 19 on the Italian music charts.

In June 2016, Lauro left Roccia Music. He created his own label called No Face Agency and released his third studio album Ragazzi madre in November of that year. This album peaked at 22 on the Italian music charts. This album was certified gold by the Federazione Industria Musicale Italiana in 2018.

In October 2017, Lauro signed with Sony Music. The following year, on 22 June, he released his fourth studio album Pour l'amour. This album peaked at 4 on the Italian music charts. This album was certified gold by FIMI in 2019. Multiple singles from this album also charted in Italy including "Amore mi", "Non sei come me", "Thoiry Remix (feat. Gemitaiz, Quentin40 and Puritano)", "Midnight Carnival (feat. Gow Tribe and Boss Doms)", "Ammò (feat. Clementino and Rocco Hunt)", and "Mamacita (feat. Vins)".

2019–2021: Sanremo appearances, 1969, 1990, 1920, and Lauro 
In December 2018, it was announced that Achille Lauro would participate in the Sanremo Music Festival 2019 with the song "Rolls Royce" and finished in 9th place.

Following his first Sanremo appearance, he released his fifth studio album 1969 on 12 April 2019. 1969 is his best-selling album to date, being certified 2× platinum by FIMI in 2021. This album peaked at 3 on the Italian music charts and had multiple singles that charted in Italy including "C'est la vie" and his Sanremo entry "Rolls Royce", which also was certified platinum in Italy. In 2020, this album was re-issued as 1969: Achille Idol Rebirth.

In December 2019, it was announced that Achille Lauro would participate in the Sanremo Music Festival for the second time with the song "Me ne frego". He finished in 8th place. The song peaked at 4 in the Italian charts and was certified 2× platinum.

In 2020, it was announced that Achille Lauro would become the Chief Creative Director of Elektra Records/Warner Music Italy. On 24 July of that year, Lauro released sixth studio album 1990, which was his first album to reach number 1 on the Italian charts and was certified gold in 2021. At the end of the year, on 4 December 2020, Lauro released his seventh studio album 1920. The album peaked at 13 on the Italian charts.

In 2021, Lauro appeared at the Sanremo Music Festival for the third time, but as a guest instead of a competing entry. On 16 April 2021, he released his eighth studio album Lauro. The album peaked at number 1 in Italy and the singles "Solo noi" and "Marilù" from the album also charted. The album was re-issued as Lauro: Achille Idol Superstar in 2022. In June 2021, he, along with Fedez and Orietta Berti, released the song "Mille". This song was a massive hit in Italy, peaking at number 1 for five weeks and being certified 6× platinum.

2022–present: Sanremo, Una voce per San Marino, and Eurovision 

In December 2021, it was announced that Lauro would compete at the Sanremo Music Festival for the third time with the song "Domenica". Performing alongside the Harlem Gospel Choir, Lauro eventually finished in fourteenth place. A few days after Sanremo 2022, it was announced that Lauro would be participating as an established artist in the final of Una voce per San Marino, the Sammarinese national final to determine their entry for the Eurovision Song Contest 2022. Performing the song "Stripper", Lauro won Una voce per San Marino by one point. He represented San Marino at the 2022 contest in Turin and did not qualify for the final.

Musical style
On several occasions, Lauro has declared that he is not very close, in terms of tastes, to Italian rap, as he does not like to be homologated to the well-known stereotype of the street rapper. In fact, he has always deviated from the canonical look of hip hop artists, causing a scandal for his eccentric aesthetics in terms of clothing.

He said he was happy to follow his compatriot Ghali, but above all the Americans Travis Scott, 6lack and Young Thug. Lauro said he is a huge fan of Vasco Rossi, Kurt Cobain, Elvis Presley and The Beatles. Among his influences, he cites to have been inspired by singer-songwriters Lucio Battisti and Rino Gaetano in reference to his rock turning point. He considers himself "a believer in God."

Controversy

Sanremo 2019 
At the Sanremo Music Festival 2019, Lauro's song "Rolls Royce" caused controversy as Striscia la notizia speculated that the song was about drugs, specifically ecstasy, due to references in the song of famous artists who were known to have taken drugs including Amy Winehouse and Jim Morrison. According to journalist Gabriele Antonucci from Panorama, the song was actually about the dream of social redemption.

Sanremo 2022 
At the Sanremo Music Festival 2022, Lauro's performance of "Domenica" caused controversy since he performed a fake baptism during his performance, which led to the bishop of Sanremo, Antonio Suetta, protesting the performance. Suetta described the performance as containing "words, attitudes and gestures that are not just offensive to religion, but to human dignity" and also stated that he felt that he could not stay silent about the performance since RAI, the state-owned Italian broadcasting company, broadcast a performance that "mocked and profaned the sacred signs of the Catholic faith by evoking the gesture of Baptism in a dull and desecrating context". On the other hand, L'Osservatore Romano, the official newspaper of the Vatican, stated that they are not impressed by Lauro's performance, because "the singer went back to the Catholic imagination. Nothing new. There has not been a more transgressive message in history than that of the Gospel", adding also, after a comparison to David Bowie's recital of the Lord's Prayer, that "nowadays the offenders are not what they used to be".

Discography

Studio albums

Extended plays

Mixtapes

Singles

As lead artist

Filmography

Films

Television

References

External links

Italian rappers
Living people
21st-century Italian male singers
1990 births
Italian Christians
Eurovision Song Contest entrants for San Marino
Eurovision Song Contest entrants of 2022